Ben Ferris is an Australian filmmaker  and Founder of the Sydney Film School, of which he was the Director from 2004 to 2018.

As a film writer/director he has won major international awards, including the Grand Prix at the Akira Kurosawa Memorial Short Film Festival in Tokyo, Japan for his short film "The Kitchen" (2003) and the Grand Prix at the One Take Film Festival in Zagreb, Croatia for his short film "Ascension" (2004).

He has written and directed the feature film "Penelope" (2009) (with an original score by renowned music composer Max Richter) which screened in National Competition at the 56th Pula Film Festival and the critically acclaimed feature hybrid drama-documentary film "57 Lawson" (2016).

In 2017 he won a residency at the prestigious Cité internationale des arts in Paris.

In 2018 he was shortlisted for the Eurimages Project Lab Award at the 53rd Karlovy Vary Film Festival for his feature film "In(di)visible".

References

Year of birth missing (living people)
Living people
Australian film directors